State Road 215 (NM 215) is a  state highway in the US state of New Mexico. NM 215's southern terminus is a continuation as County Route 218 (CR 218) southeast of Las Placitas, and the northern terminus is at NM 554 in El Rito.

Major intersections

See also

References

215
Transportation in Rio Arriba County, New Mexico